Yaniv Lavi is an Israeli former footballer and currently the assistant manager of Hapoel Ironi Kiryat Shmona.

Honours
Liga Artzit (1):
2000–01
Toto Cup (Leumit) (2):
2007, 2010
Liga Leumit (2):
2006–07, 2009–10

References

External links
Stats at sports.walla.co.il

1977 births
Israeli Jews
Living people
Israeli footballers
Maccabi Netanya F.C. players
Hapoel Ra'anana A.F.C. players
Maccabi Herzliya F.C. players
Hapoel Ramat Gan F.C. players
Hapoel Ironi Kiryat Shmona F.C. players
Hapoel Nir Ramat HaSharon F.C. players
Liga Leumit players
Israeli Premier League players
Israeli people of Libyan-Jewish descent
Footballers from Netanya
Association football defenders